Thomas Hinds (January 9, 1780August 23, 1840) was an American soldier and politician from the state of Mississippi, who served in the United States Congress from 1828 to 1831.

A hero of the War of 1812, Hinds is best known today as the namesake of Hinds County.

Biography

Early years
Thomas Hinds was born in Berkeley County, Virginia, (now part of West Virginia), on January 9, 1780. He would later move to (Old) Greenville in Jefferson County, Mississippi, where he was appointed justice and assessor of the county in 1805.

Hinds was made a member of the Mississippi Territorial Council in 1806, remaining in that position until 1808.

Military career
Hinds was commissioned as a cavalry lieutenant in October 1805, gaining promotion to major in September 1813, during the War of 1812. His forces participated with distinction in the Battle of Pensacola (1814) and the Battle of New Orleans (1814–1815), under the command of General Andrew Jackson.

Battle of New Orleans
During the Battle of New Orleans, Major Thomas Hinds commanded a force of mounted Mississippi militia dragoons. Hindi’s militia dragoons conducted hit-and-run paramilitary operations against the British.

Force in reconnaissance
On December 23, 1814. Thomas Hinds and 100 Mississippi militia dragoons made a surprise hit-and-run force in reconnaissance type of raid on British lines. The American militia dragoons charged by surprise driving in British outposts and halting outside of musket range. The American militia dragoons survey the British troop positions, troop numbers, and other intelligence. Then the American militia dragoons rode away back to American lines dodging volleys.

Andrew Jackson’s Night Attack at Villere Plantation
Andrew Jackson conducted a hit-and-run night attack on the British encampment at Villere Plantation. Andrew Jackson stealthily led his division in the front while John Coffee led his division on the flank. Thomas Hind’s militia dragoon’s were part of John Coffee’s division. But Hinds and his dragoon’s did not take part in the attack but stay in the rear as reserve. After the American force viciously attacked the British for some time, the raiders withdrew. American losses were 24 killed, 115 wounded, and 74 missing. The British losses were 46 killed, 167 wounded, and 64 missing. while the British reported their losses as 46 killed, 167 wounded, and 64 missing.

Burning Cane Stubble
It was December 26, 1814. Some British units were using cane stubble to conceal and cover their forces. The Americans wanted to have a clear line of fire against the British army. So Hind’s militia dragoons were sent in to destroy the cane stubble the British were using. The militia dragoon approached the edge of the terrain, rode out on the plains 450 yards from the British position, and ignited the cane stubble which deprived the British of their cover. Hind’s dragoons withdrew back to American lines safely.

Harassing British outposts
As time was passing by, Thomas Hind’s dragoons grew more bold and started making hit-and-run cavalry attacks on British lines. Towards the evening of December 27, 1814. A British rocket was set up. Thomas Hinds and his militia dragoons dashed up to the British outposts in parade exercise, fire volleys into the British lines and then gallop back again hurraying and shouting in savage glee and derision.

Further Guerrilla Actions
The British did not want to advance until dawn of December 28, 1814. Hinds and his Mississippi militia dragoons came near the British positions unseen. The American militia dragoons slept besides their saddled horses, their weapons always in reach, with no fires against the cold to avoid exposing their positions. Occasionally one or more militiamen crept close enough to the British outposts to fire at them, scattering all men in all directions and occasionally getting closer to kill specific targets. It kept the British off guard, but early sunlight revealed the full British columns in the distance. Hind’s men who were concealed in the uncut cane heard the British setting up congreve rockets. The British fired rockets into the cane. Hinds and his Mississippi militia dragoons withdrew back to Andrew Jackson’s lines avoiding the British rockets.

Further raids on British positions
It was December 30, 1814. Thomas Hind’s dragoons continued to mount cavalry hit-and-run raids on the British positions. In one raid, there was a group of British soldiers in a ditch. Major Thomas Hinds and his dragoons conducted a raid to attack this position. Hind’s dragoons rode some distance towards the British position. Then the American militia dragoons charged the position and leaped over the British soldiers in the ditch. The dragoons wheeled back and fired their pistols at the British soldiers in the ditch. Then the Dragoons galloped away and withdrew. However, the stunned British soldiers were in a few seconds able to regain their composure and fire a volley at the dragoons. The dragoons suffered 3 wounded men and two horses also wounded. In other occasions, when British soldiers set up redoubt batteries. Andrew Jackson would send Hind’s dragoons to raid the British positions to gather intelligence and the report back to headquarters.

Attempt to lure the British into the open
Andrew Jackson’s line was holding. Jackson wanted to lure the British out into the open to be bombarded by his artillery. He sent Hind’s dragoons to taunt the British and draw them out. Thomas Hinds and his cavalrymen conducted drill conducts two hundred yards within the British positions fore 90 minutes taunting the British. The British did not take the bait. So the Hinds and his mounted men withdrew back to the American entrenched lines. Many Americans manning their entrenchment cheered Hind’s horsemen for their conduct.

Thomas Hind’s final paramilitary operation
After the major battle of New Orleans where American infantry and artillery in entrenched positions decimated the British army. The British forces started withdrawing. Andrew Jackson sent Thomas Hinds and his dragoons to harass the British while they were retreating. Colonel Laronade with Colonel Kemper accompanied by Hind’s dragoons pursued the enemy through the prairie. Hind’s dragoons captured 4 British prisoners. Hinds, his mounted men, and the other American forces tried to erect a cannon to start harassing the British forces. But heavy British cannon and musket fire killed one militia dragoon and wounded 2 other mounted militiamen. With so much British artillery and musket fire. The American colonels along with Hind’s dragoon’s decided to head back to headquarters. Thomas Hinds, his mounted militiamen, and the two American colonels withdrew back to American lines with their 4 prisoners.

Promotion and Retirement
Late in 1815, following the death of General Ferdinand Claiborne, Hinds was promoted by President James Madison as Brigadier General of the Mississippi territorial militia. He was continued as the highest officer of the Mississippi militia in the rank of Major general following statehood (late 1817), resigning this position in December 1819.

Return to politics
In August 1819 Hinds ran for Governor of Mississippi against George Poindexter but was soundly defeated, garnering only 38% of the vote behind Poindexter's 62%. (Mrs. Hinds had died in late June of the same year, at age 28.)

Hinds was elected to the Mississippi Legislature in 1823.

Following the resignation of William Haile on September 12, 1828, he was elected to the 20th Congress to complete his term. He later won re-election and held that position until March 3, 1831.

Thomas was married to Lemenda Green, daughter of Congressman Thomas M. Green.

Death and legacy
Hinds died on August 23, 1840, in Jefferson County, Mississippi. He was sixty years old at the time of his death.

During his lifetime Hinds was regarded as the leading military hero of Mississippi. He was remembered by Congressman J.F.H. Claiborne as having been "beloved by his troops, and one of the most intrepid men that ever lived."

Hinds County, Mississippi, home of the state capital, was named in his honor.

Notes

References

External links
 "Thomas Hinds", at JeffersonCountyMS.org
 Lawrence Kestenbaum (ed.), "Thomas Hinds" at The Political Graveyard
 

1780 births
1840 deaths
People from Berkeley County, West Virginia
People from Washington County, Mississippi
Members of the Mississippi Legislature
Members of the Mississippi Territorial Legislature
American military personnel of the War of 1812
Hinds County, Mississippi
Jacksonian members of the United States House of Representatives from Mississippi
19th-century American politicians
People of the Creek War